Allscott is a small village  north west of Wellington, Shropshire. The River Tern flows by. It falls within the parish of Wrockwardine and the borough of Telford and Wrekin. Nearby is the small village of Walcot.

Etymology
The name derives of Aldescote which translates as Aldred's Cottage.

Recent history
In 1927, a sugar beet factory (which came to be owned by British Sugar), once stood in the village and was a major local employer. One of the small steam locomotives that used to work in the factory has been preserved at the Foxfield Railway in Staffordshire. The factory buildings have been demolished since its closure and in 2015, an application to build 470 homes on the site was granted permission by Telford and Wrekin Council. Concerns about overcrowded roads have led to calls for a railway station to be opened on the site as it is adjacent to the Shrewsbury to Wolverhampton Line, but the developers have stated that a railway station is not in their plans.

Sport
Allscott FC are a football club based at the Allscott Sports & Social Club in the village. The club have recently been accepted for promotion to the West Midlands Regional League Division One, after finishing third in the West Midlands Regional League Division Two (2016-17 season). Allscott also finished runners-up in the Mercian Regional League Premier Division (2015-16 season). The club have also won the Shropshire County Challenge Cup on one occasion (2014–15), as well as the Shropshire County Football League Division One league title (2011–12).

Allscott CC play in division 1 of the Shropshire County Cricket League after being relegated from the Premier Division in 2014.

Namesake
There is another hamlet in Shropshire also called Allscott, but to the northeast of Bridgnorth and in the parish of Worfield in south-east of the county.().

See also
Listed buildings in Wrockwardine

References

External links
Aerial imagery of the sugar factory from 1930

Villages in Shropshire
Telford and Wrekin